The Green Carnation is a 1954 British crime film directed by John Lemont and starring Wayne Morris, Mary Germaine and Marcia Ashton.

The film's sets were designed by John Stoll. The film was distributed by Republic Pictures, and is sometimes known by the alternative title of The Green Buddha.

Cast

References

Bibliography
 Chibnall, Steve & McFarlane, Brian. The British 'B' Film. Palgrave MacMillan, 2009.

External links

1954 films
British crime films
1954 crime films
Films directed by John Lemont
Films set in London
Republic Pictures films
1950s English-language films
British black-and-white films
1950s British films